The States is a 2007 American documentary television series about the history of each state in the United States of America, narrated by Edward Herrmann.

The show documents each of the 50 states in the union. The show begins with an introduction to the five states to be documented within the episode. Each state's segment begins with the narrator giving a clue as to what that state might be, and then revealing the answer. ( e.g. "There is a North Dakota and a South Dakota, a North Carolina and a South Carolina, but there's been one "West" anything! Welcome to West Virginia.") There is then a billboard that pops up showing the state nickname, motto, population, population ranking within the union, date the state entered the union, and state flag. During interviews with historians or notable people from a state, the state's quarter is shown. Since the series was produced in 2007, Oklahoma, New Mexico, Arizona, Alaska, and Hawaii are shown with their flags. Those quarters were released in 2008

The show then highlights the history of the state itself, including notable events that have happened there, and highlights other noteworthy things in that state. In 2010 a sister presentation and then series, How the States Got Their Shapes was aired.

Episode list

See also
 List of programs broadcast by History (TV channel)
 History Channel

References

History (American TV channel) original programming